La Salle Street Bridge is a historic Spandrel Arch bridge located at South Bend, St. Joseph County, Indiana.  It was built in 1907, and is a three-span, reinforced concrete bridge that crosses the St. Joseph River. It measures 279 feet long and 51 feet wide.

It was listed on the National Register of Historic Places in 1999.

References

Arch bridges in the United States
Road bridges on the National Register of Historic Places in Indiana
Bridges completed in 1907
Buildings and structures in South Bend, Indiana
National Register of Historic Places in St. Joseph County, Indiana
Concrete bridges in the United States
Transportation buildings and structures in St. Joseph County, Indiana